Sardis Creek is a stream in the U.S. state of Georgia. It is a tributary to the Ohoopee River.

Sardis Creek derives its name from James Sartain, an early landowner. Many variant names have been recorded, including: "Sardins Creek", "Sartains Creek", "Sartian Creek", "Sartins Creek", "Sartium Creek", and "Sertains Creek".

References

Rivers of Georgia (U.S. state)
Rivers of Emanuel County, Georgia